Carlo Spatocco (31 May 1883 – 28 January 1945) was an Italian general during World War II.

Biography

Spatocco was born in Chieti on May 31, 1883, the son of Francesco Spatocco, and after enlisting in the Royal Italian Army he participated in the Italo-Turkish War with the rank of lieutenant. He distinguished himself in the battle of Zanzur (June 8, 1912), for which he was decorated with a Bronze Medal of Military Valour. During the First World War he distinguished himself in October 1916 on the Veliki Kribak, receiving another Bronze Medal of Military Valour. After the war he commanded the 17th Infantry Regiment "Acqui" with the rank of colonel.

He participated in the Second Italo-Ethiopian War, fighting in the battle of Amba Aradam, and after promotion to brigadier general, on June 16, 1936, he assumed command of the "Sila" Infantry Brigade. In 1937 he was briefly appointed Administrative Director at the Personnel Office of the Ministry of War in Rome. After promotion to major general on 1 September 1937, he assumed command of the 63rd Infantry Division Cirene, stationed in North Africa, which he kept until 19 September 1940, when he was replaced by General Alessandro de Guidi and took command of the XXI Army Corps for a brief period. 
In 1941 he assumed command of the Tripoli Fortress Area, later renamed XX Army Corps, and on 1 July of the same year he was promoted to lieutenant general. On November 29, he assumed command of the IV Army Corps stationed in Albania, replacing General Camillo Mercalli.

When the Armistice of Cassibile was announced, on 8 September 1943, the corps under his command, operating within the 9th Army of General Renzo Dalmazzo, was deployed in Albania, with headquarters in Durres, and consisted of three infantry divisions (11th Infantry Division Brennero, 49th Infantry Division Parma and 151st Infantry Division Perugia) in addition to various smaller units.

The IV Corps was overrun by German forces during Operation Achse, and on 21 September Spatocco was captured and transferred first to Germany and then to officer POW camp 64Z in Schokken (now Skoki) in Poland, where most Italian generals and admirals captured during Operation Achse had been imprisoned. In January 1945, with the Red Army approaching, the camp was evacuated with a forced march through the snow. Spatocco, unable to keep pace with the other prisoners, was murdered by the SS on January 28, 1945, along with Generals Alberto Trionfi, Emanuele Balbo Bertone, Giuseppe Andreoli, Ugo Ferrero and Alessandro Vaccaneo.

References

1883 births
1945 deaths
Italian generals
Italian military personnel of World War I
Italian military personnel of World War II
Italian military personnel killed in World War II
Italian military personnel of the Italo-Turkish War
Recipients of the Silver Medal of Military Valor
Recipients of the Bronze Medal of Military Valor
Italian people executed by Nazi Germany
People executed by Nazi Germany by firearm
Deaths by firearm in Poland
Italian prisoners of war in World War II
World War II prisoners of war held by Germany
Italian military personnel of the Second Italo-Ethiopian War
Italian people executed abroad